Saint Joseph University or University of Saint Joseph may refer to:

Universities and colleges
 Saint Joseph's College, Rensselaer, Indiana, founded in 1889
 Saint Joseph's University, Philadelphia, Pennsylvania, founded in 1851
 Saint Joseph University, Beirut, Lebanon, founded in 1875
 St. Joseph's University (New York), founded in 1916
 University of Saint Joseph (Connecticut), Connecticut, founded in 1932
 University of Saint Joseph, Macau, China, founded in 1996
 St. Joseph University, Nagaland, India 
 St. Joseph University In Tanzania, Dar es Salaam, Tanzania, founded in 2011

Defunct universities and colleges
 University of St. Joseph's College, former university in Memramcook, New Brunswick, founded in 1864